"Not So Different" is a song recorded by Japanese-American singer-songwriter Ai. It was released on November 25, 2020. The song was written by Ai and Rachel West with additional songwriting credits from producers Avedon and Scott Storch and was included on It's All Me, Vol. 2 (2021).

On December 11, 2020, a remix featuring Japanese rapper Awich was released and later included on It's All Me, Vol. 2. A J-pop and pop rap song, "Not So Different" lyrically is about equality and world peace. The song has been compared to Ai's 2006 single "I Wanna Know".

Background 
Ai originally wrote and recorded the song during her 2019 recording session in Los Angeles, California. She originally performed the song in June 2020 amidst the George Floyd protests in an interview with Salesforce. In October 2020, Ai announced she would be participating in the One Young World summit to take place in Tokyo in May 2021. "Not So Different" originally was not planned for release as a single nor planned to be included on Ai's It's All Me EP's until November 2020. In an interview with Oricon regarding the lyric "...a peace sign instead of a middle finger", Ai stated she normally does not express herself directly in her songs and that she "...wanted to express such a part in an easy-to-understand manner."

Awich remix 
A remix of Not So Different featuring Awich was announced a few days after the release of the solo version. Regarding the remix, Ai stated it originally was not planned until she discussed it with her manager. It was released on December 11, 2020.

Music video 
A music video for the solo version was released on November 25, 2020. A One Young World Japan version was released in December 2020.

In February 2021, a music video for the remix version featuring Awich was released.

Live performances 
Ai previously performed the song before its release in June 2020. She performed the song with Awich in November 2020.

Credits and personnel 
Credits adapted from Tidal.

Solo version

Musicians 

 Ai Uemura – vocals, production, songwriting
 Rachel West – songwriting
 Vincent Van den Ende – songwriting, production
 Scott Storch –songwriting, production

Technical 

 Randy Merrill – mastering engineer
 D.O.I – mixer

Awich remix

Musicians 

 Ai Uemura – vocals, production, songwriting
 Akiko Urasaki – vocals, songwriting
 Rachel West – songwriting
 Vincent Van den Ende – songwriting, production
 Scott Storch –songwriting, production

Technical 

 Randy Merrill – mastering engineer
 D.O.I – mixer
 Keisuke Fujimaki – recording engineer
 Keisuke Suwa – recording engineer
 Shiori Maruoka – recording engineer

Track listing 
Digital download

 Not So Different – 3:42

Awich remix

 Not So Different (feat. Awich) – 3:41

Release history

References 
2020 singles
2020 songs
Ai (singer) songs
EMI Records singles
Universal Music Group singles
Universal Music Japan singles
Songs against racism and xenophobia
Songs about George Floyd
Songs based on actual events
Song recordings produced by Scott Storch

Songs written by Ai (singer)
Song recordings produced by Ai (singer)